The House of Religions is located in Hanover, Germany, on the former location of the Athanasiuskirche. Held by Haus der Religionen Hannover e.V., an organization established on 2 December 2008 by people from seven religions (Baháʼí, Buddhism, Christianity, Hinduism, Islam and Judaism) with the purpose of promoting dialogue among the religions in Hanover.

References

External links

 Haus der Religionen Hannover e.V.

Hanover
Religious organisations based in Germany
Interfaith organizations
Organizations established in 2008
2008 establishments in Germany
Religion in Lower Saxony
Christian–Islamic–Jewish interfaith dialogue